Zhao Hong (born November 4, 1966) is a Chinese former volleyball player who won bronze in the 1988 Summer Olympics. She now lives in the Netherlands with her husband and three children.

References

Living people
Chinese women's volleyball players
Olympic bronze medalists for China
Olympic volleyball players of China
Volleyball players at the 1988 Summer Olympics
Olympic medalists in volleyball
1966 births
Medalists at the 1988 Summer Olympics
20th-century Chinese women